Neville Duarte de Almeida (born 1941),  known as Neville d'Almeida, is a Brazilian filmmaker, screenwriter, actor, photographer and multimedia artist, involved with contemporary art, installations, objects of art and performance.

Life and career
D'Almeida was born in Belo Horizonte into a Methodist family. He studied theater at the TU (Teatro Universitário de Minas Gerais), participated in the Centro de Estudos Cinematográficos (Center of Film Studies), and the Centro Mineiro Experimental when he started to work as an filmmaker. Some of its transgressive, avant-garde films were censored or banned by the Brazilian military dictatorship. His 1978  film Lady on the Bus, starring Sônia Braga, is the third highest-grossing Brazilian film of all time 

In 1970 he went to New York, where he collaborated with Hélio Oiticica in the art installation Cosmococas.

Filmography

Director
1970: Jardim de Guerra
1971: Piranhas do Asfalto
1971: Mangue Bangue
1972: Gatos da Noite
1973: Surucucu Catiripapo
1978: Lady on the Bus 
1980: Os Sete Gatinhos
1980: Música para Sempre
1982: Rio Babilônia
1991: Killed the Family and Went to the Movies
1997: Navalha na Carne
1999: Hoje é Dia de Rock
2005: Maksuara — Crepúsculo dos deuses
2015: A Frente Fria que a Chuva Traz

Actor
1968: Hunger for Love - Felipe's Roommate in New York
1968: The Red Light Bandit
1969: O Anjo Nasceu
1970: Sem Essa, Aranha
1971: Mangue Bangue
1985: Noite
1985: Areias Escaldantes - Espião
1988: Moon over Parador - Family Member
1989: Sermões, a História de Antônio Vieira - (final film role)

References

Living people
1941 births
Brazilian filmmakers
Brazilian artists
People from Belo Horizonte